HMS Calliope was a  light cruiser of the Royal Navy under construction at the outbreak of the First World War. Both Calliope and her sister ship  were based on the earlier cruiser . They were effectively test ships for the use of geared turbines which resulted in the one less funnel. They also received slightly thicker armour. They led into the first of the Cambrian subclass.

Design
Eight light cruisers were ordered for the Royal Navy in the 1913 budget. The six ships of the Caroline class used conventional direct drive turbine engines but Calliope and Caroline each had a different engine design using geared reduction to match optimum working speeds of turbines and propellers.

Calliope was built at HM Dockyard, Chatham. She was laid down in January 1914, launched on 17 December 1914, and completed in June 1915.

Calliope had four shafts as used in the Caroline design but unlike the two used in Champion. Gearing increased the efficiency of power transmission to the water so allowed smaller boilers and turbines to be used than otherwise would be the case. Nominal design power for the same target speed was therefore reduced from 40,000 shp in the Caroline class to 37,500 shp. Propeller speed was 480 rpm.

Service history

World War I

Commissioned in June 1915, Calliope was assigned to the Grand Fleet for service as flagship of the 4th Light Cruiser Squadron. She was badly damaged by a fuel oil fire in her boiler room while at sea on 19 March 1916, but was repaired in time to be one of the five ships in the 4th Light Cruiser Squadron at the Battle of Jutland on 31 May-1 June 1916. Under the command of Commodore Charles E. Le Mesurier, HMS Calliope received a number of hits just before nightfall on 31 May (notably by the German battleships  and ), and 10 of her crew were killed.

In September 1917, Calliope helped to sink four German trawler minesweepers in the North Sea off the coast of Jutland.

Post-war
In March 1919, Calliope was commissioned for service with the 8th Light Cruiser Squadron on the North America and West Indies Station where she suffered with another engine room fire in the Atlantic Ocean off the Azores in October 1919.  She returned to Devonport for repairs, which were carried out between November 1919 and March 1920, and then recommissioned for continued service on the North America and West Indies Station.  She returned to the United Kingdom in December 1920 for a refit and paid off at the Nore in January 1921. She was in the Nore Reserve from October 1921 to May 1924, when she was commissioned for service with the 2nd Cruiser Squadron in the Atlantic Fleet.

Between 1925 and 1926, Calliope was used to transport troops before paying off into dockyard control at the Nore in April 1926 for a refit. Between  1927 and 1928 she was used for trooping runs again, becoming the Senior Naval Officer's ship in the Nore Reserve in December 1927. In September 1928 received her last commission, this time with the 3rd Cruiser Squadron in the Mediterranean Fleet, which ended in January 1930 when she paid off into reserve at Portsmouth Dockyard.

Disposal
Calliope was transferred to dockyard control in January 1931. She was sold for scrap on 28 August 1931 to Thos. W. Ward of Inverkeithing, Scotland.

Honours and awards

Calliope received one battle honour, for the Battle of Jutland in 1916.

References

Notes

Sources

External links 
 Battle of Jutland Crew Lists Project - HMS Calliope Crew List

 

C-class cruisers
Ships built in Chatham
1914 ships
World War I cruisers of the United Kingdom